Irajá Silvestre Filho (born 3 February 1983) more commonly known as  Irajá  is a Brazilian politician and businessperson. Although born in Goiás, has spent his political career representing Tocantins, having served as state senator since 2019 and previously state deputy from 2011 to 2019.

Personal life
Abreu was born to Irajá Silvestre and Kátia Abreu. Prior to becoming a politician Abreu worked as a businessman in the agricultural industry. Abreu's mother Kátia is also a politician who has served as a senator and government minister, and Abreu has publicly defended his mother against her critics.

Political career
Abreu voted against the impeachment motion of then-president Dilma Rousseff. He would later vote in favor of opening a similar corruption investigation against Rousseff's successor Michel Temer, and voted in favor of the 2017 Brazilian labor reforms.

In the 2018 Brazilian general election Abreu was elected to the national senate with  214,355 votes. At the age of 35, he broke the record as the youngest ever individual elected to the national senate.

References

1983 births
Living people
People from Goiânia
Social Democratic Party (Brazil, 2011) politicians
Members of the Chamber of Deputies (Brazil) from Tocantins
Members of the Federal Senate (Brazil)
Brazilian businesspeople